Yan Yuryevich Ivanin (born 4 March 1989) is a Russian former football defender.

Club career
He played in the Russian Football National League for FC Zvezda Irkutsk in 2008.

External links
 
 Career summary by Sportbox
 

1989 births
Living people
Russian footballers
Association football defenders
FC Zvezda Irkutsk players
FC Baikal Irkutsk players
FC Chita players